Richard James Aldrich  (born 7 December 1961) is a British political scientist and a historian of espionage who has written intensively about intelligence and security communities. Since September 2007, he has been a professor of International Security at the Department of Politics and International Studies, University of Warwick. He was a professor at the School of Politics and International Relations, University of Nottingham and was co-editor of the journal Intelligence and National Security for eight years. In 1990 Aldrich gained his PhD from Corpus Christie College, University of Cambridge.

Works

Monographs 
The Black Door Lib/E: Spies, Secret Intelligence, and British Prime Ministers (William the 4th, 2020)
GCHQ: The Uncensored Story of Britain's Most Secret Intelligence Agency (HarperPress, 2010)
Intelligence and the War against Japan: Britain, America and the Politics of Secret Service (Cambridge University Press, 2008)
The Faraway War: Personal Diaries of the Second World War in Asia and the Pacific (Transworld Publishers Limited, 2006)
Witness To War: Diaries Of The Second World War In Europe And The Middle East (Doubleday, 2004)
The Hidden Hand: Britain, America, and Cold War Secret Intelligence (John Murray Press, 2001)
Intelligence and the War Against Japan: Britain, America and the Politics of Secret Service (Cambridge University Press, 2000)
Espionage, Security and Intelligence in Britain, 1945-1970 (Manchester University Press, 1998)
The Key to the South: Britain, the United States, and Thailand During the Approach of the Pacific War, 1929-1942 (Oxford University Press, 1993)
British Intelligence, Strategy and the Cold War, 1945-51(Taylor & Francis, 1992)

Co-authored books 
The Secret Royals: Spying and the Crown, from Victoria to Diana (Atlantic Books, 2021) with Rory Cormac
Secret Intelligence: A Reader (Routledge, 2019) with Christopher Andrew and Wesley K. Wark
Spying on the World: The Declassified Documents of the Joint Intelligence Committee, 1936-2013 (Edinburgh University Press, 2014) with Rory Cormac and Michael S. Goodman
The Clandestine Cold War in Asia, 1945-65: Western Intelligence, Propaganda and Special Operations (Taylor & Francis, 2000) with Ming-Yeh Rawnsley and Gary D. Rawnsley
Intelligence, Defence and Diplomacy: British Policy in the Post-War World (Taylor & Francis, 1994) with Michael F. Hopkins

References

Living people
1961 births
People from Rochdale
Fellows of the Royal Historical Society
Alumni of the University of Cambridge
British political scientists
20th-century British historians
21st-century British historians
British historians of espionage